Al Anood Al Obeidli (born 1990) is currently a full time online reseller. She studied Visual Artist in visual arts from Abu Dhabi, UAE. The point of departure for all her work is collage.

She has a degree in Visual Arts from the College of Arts and Creative Enterprises at Zayed University, and has showcased her work there. Her art has also been exhibited at Abu Dhabi’s Tashkeel Gallery, the East-East: UAE Meets Japan exhibition, The (fourth) March Project, The Salama bint Hamdan Emerging Artists Fellowship, and From Barcelona to Abu Dhabi: Works from the MACBA Art Collection.

Al Obaidly graduated from the Salama Bint Hamdan Al Nahyan Foundation Emerging Artists Fellowship Programme. She has been featured in journals such as: My Art Guides, Artslant, Mutual Art, and The Gulf News, among others.

In 2014 she received the Shaikha Salama Artist in Residence Award.

References 

1990 births
Living people
21st-century painters
21st-century women artists
Emirati contemporary artists
Emirati women artists
People from Abu Dhabi